Humberto Aspitia (12 December 1928 – 11 July 2003) was an Argentine sports shooter. He competed in the 50 metre pistol event at the 1964 Summer Olympics.

References

External links
 

1928 births
2003 deaths
Argentine male sport shooters
Olympic shooters of Argentina
Shooters at the 1964 Summer Olympics
Place of birth missing